Liubov Efimenko (born 20 June 1999) is a Finnish figure skater. She is the 2014 Finnish national silver medalist and has won three senior international medals, including bronze at the 2014 Nordics and silver at the 2016 Skate Helena. She has also competed in pair skating with Dmitry Epstein for the Netherlands.

Personal life 
Liubov Efimenko was born on 20 June 1999 in Saint Petersburg, Russia. She moved with her family to Finland when she was nine years old. She followed her older sister into skating.

Programs

Competitive highlights 
CS: Challenger Series; JGP: Junior Grand Prix

Pairs with Epstein for the Netherlands

Pairs with Penasse for Finland

Ladies' Singles for Finland

References

External links 
 

Finnish female single skaters
1999 births
Living people
Russian emigrants to Finland
Figure skaters from Saint Petersburg
Dutch female pair skaters